Nicola Saggio was an Italian Roman Catholic professed oblate of the Order of Minims.

He was beatified on 17 September 1786 and was canonized as a saint of the Roman Catholic Church on 23 November 2014.

Life
Nicola Saggio was born on 6 January 1650 in Longobardi, a small town on the Tyrrhenian coast. His parents were Fulvio Saggio, a farmer, and Aurelia Saggio née Pizzini. He was the first of five children while the twins Antonio and Domenica followed and then Nicola and Muzio. He was baptized in the names of "Giovanni Battista Clemente" on 10 January 1650.

His parents raised him with high moral and spiritual values and instilled in him a Christian education. He visited the convent of the Minims which made him desire the religious life as his path in life.

He was famous as a catechist in Longobardi and in Roman circles. A further change in his spiritual life was recorded in 1683 after a pilgrimage on foot to Loreto to ask God – through the intercession of the Blessed Virgin Mary – for the liberation of Vienna from the Turks.

Sainthood

On 17 March 1771 he was made Venerable once Pope Clement XIV confirmed his life of heroic virtue. Pope Pius VI presided over the rite of beatification for the late oblate on 17 September 1786 in Saint Peter's Basilica after approving two miracles attributed to his intercession on 2 April 1786. After the beatification he was made the patron of Longobardi (his village).

The third and final miracle for the canonization occurred in 1938 for a mason of Longobardi who fell from a scaffold without sustaining injuries. The diocesan investigation took place between 24 May 2008 and 15 June 2009; the process received the validation of the Congregation for the Causes of Saints on 11 March 2011 while the consulting medical board approved the miracle on 13 December 2012. Theologians voiced approval on 28 November 2013 while the C.C.S. also assented on 4 March 2014. Pope Francis canonized him as a saint on 23 November 2014 in Saint Peter's Square after approving the miracle on 3 April 2014.

The postulator at the time of the canonization was the Rev. Ottavio Laino.

References

External links
 San Nicola Saggio 
 Hagiography Circle

1650 births
1709 deaths
People from the Province of Cosenza
17th-century Christian saints
17th-century venerated Christians
17th-century Italian Christian monks
18th-century Christian saints
18th-century venerated Christians
18th-century Italian Christian monks
Canonizations by Pope Francis
Italian Roman Catholic saints
Minims (religious order)
Venerated Catholics